Phaenagrotis is a genus of moths of the family Noctuidae.

Selected species
Phaenagrotis hecateia Köhler, 1953

References
Natural History Museum Lepidoptera genus database

Noctuinae
Noctuoidea genera